Yamila Badell Graña (born 1 March 1996) is a Uruguayan footballer who plays as a forward for Spanish Primera Federación club Real Oviedo and the Uruguay women's national team. She is the first player in her country to score in a FIFA U-17 Women's World Cup.

Club career
She started playing baby football at the club Playa Honda, facing boys. She later joined Colón Football Club of the AUF. In 2015 she emigrated to Spain to play for Málaga for half a season. She returned to Colón in 2016 and the club won its fourth consecutive Uruguayan Championship.

In December 2017, Badell joined Spanish club CD Tacón.

In June 2019, Badell left Tacón after the team promoted to the Primera División and then its place was purchased by Real Madrid CF.

International career
Badell participated in the 2012 South American Under-17 Women's Championship in Bolivia, where she was crowned the tournament's top scorer with 9 goals, and together with her teammates achieved the historical first qualification of a Uruguayan women's team to a FIFA World Cup.

In the U-17 World Cup, played in Azerbaijan, Uruguay lost its three matches, but Badell managed to score twice in the last match against Germany (a 2–5 defeat), thus marking the first goal by a Uruguayan in a FIFA Women's World Cup.

International goals
Scores and results list Uruguay's goal tally first

Personal life 
Yamila Badell is the daughter of former footballer Gustavo Badell.

Honours
 Top Goalscorer South American Under-17 Women's Championship: 2012
 First Uruguayan to score in a FIFA U-17 Women's World Cup: 2012

References

1996 births
Living people
Footballers from Montevideo
Uruguayan women's footballers
Women's association football forwards
Colón F.C. players
Málaga CF Femenino players
Real Madrid Femenino players
CDE Racing Féminas players
Real Oviedo (women) players
Club Nacional de Football players
Segunda Federación (women) players
Uruguay women's international footballers
Uruguayan expatriate women's footballers
Uruguayan expatriate sportspeople in Spain
Expatriate women's footballers in Spain
Uruguayan people of Catalan descent